Udumalai, also known as Udumalaipettai and Udumalpet, is a town in Tiruppur district in the Indian state of Tamil Nadu. Udumalaipettai is located 535 km (332 mi) south west from the state capital, Chennai and 72 km (45 mi) away from Coimbatore, the second largest city in the state. 

It is famous for spinning mills. It is the headquarters of Udumalaipettai taluk and as of 2011, the town had a population of 61,133. Udumalpet town is under Udumalpet Legislative Assembly constituency.

History
The municipality was established in 1918 and upgraded to second grade municipality in 1970. It was declared as a first grade municipality in 1979 and further upgrades to selection grade municipality in 1984. The extent of the municipality is 7.41 km2 of which 6.582 km2 is urban and 0.828 km2 is rural. The city was part of Coimbatore district until 2008 when it became part of the newly formed Tiruppur district, a change which was opposed by the residents.

Geography
Udumalai is surrounded by Western Ghats on three sides. The average altitude of the town is 1208 feet above MSL. The topography is undulated and the general slope is from west to North. Black clay soil is the predominant soil of the area. The town gets major rainfall during the south west monsoon period. The average annual rainfall is 501.40 mm. Black and red soil types are found in the town. The soil contains more of alumina and gypsum. While black soil area is utilized for agriculture, the areas with red soil have more urbanized uses.

Demographics

According to 2011 census, Udumalaipettai had a population of 61,133 with a sex-ratio of 1,041 females for every 1,000 males, much above the national average of 929. A total of 4,939 were under the age of six, constituting 2,489 males and 2,450 females. Scheduled Castes and Scheduled Tribes accounted for 8.67% and 0.07% of the population respectively. The average literacy of the town was 83.85%, compared to the national average of 72.99%. The town had a total of 17,132 households. There were a total of 24,756 workers, comprising 226 cultivators, 289 main agricultural laborers, 450 in house hold industries, 21,403 other workers, 2,388 marginal workers, 51 marginal cultivators, 70 marginal agricultural laborers, 46 marginal workers in household industries and 2,221 other marginal workers. As per the religious census of 2011, Udumalaipettai had 81.83% Hindus, 14.49% Muslims, 3.19% Christians, 0.01% Sikhs, 0.01% Buddhists and 0.46% following other religions.

Education
There are about fifteen higher secondary schools and a handful of Arts and Science colleges like Vidyasagar College of Arts and Science, Government Arts College, Udumalpet, and GVG College for women, and few others. Polytechnic colleges and Government ITI are available. Access to the advanced or quality coaching for various competitive examinations is limited, thus triggering urban migration to major cities such as Coimbatore and Chennai.

Government is running Higher Secondary School for boys and girls separately along with one co-educational school located in the centre of the town.Many Central Board of Secondary Education schools have mushroomed in the recent past.

Sainik school run by The Sainik Schools Society, an organization under the Ministry of Defence, is located in Amaravathi Nagar, about 15 kilometres from the town.

In March 2019, the Union Council of Ministers had given approval for establishing a Kendriya Vidyalaya school in the town.

Economy

The economy of Udumalpet and its surroundings is mainly based on agriculture and textile industry.

The predominant occupation of the town is trade and commerce. Udumalpet acts as the commercial hub for surrounding villages. Many commercial establishments and banks are located in the town. As Udumalpet is the Taluk headquarters many government offices are located in this town. 

Main crops cultivated in this area are Coconut, Vegetables, Maize, Millet, Sugarcane and Paddy. Most of the farmers also indulge in Dairy farming. Sizeable number of farmers also engage in Poultry farming. The famous poultry brand Suguna Foods was established and headquartered in Udumalpet which was later moved to Coimbatore.

The town, in the 1980s and 1990s, had a developed spinning industry but it has since declined due to labor shortages and other labor-related issues. Now there are many micro and small textile industries located in and around Udumalpet which provides employment to people after agriculture.

One of Indias oldest business conglomerates GVG group was founded in Udumalaipettai. GVG group are pioneers in Paper manufacturing and Textile industry. 

The surrounding areas has seen a surge in windmill installations because of the location of the town across the Palghat Gap.

Over the years, a sizeable number of population have migrated to the nearby industrial cities of Coimbatore and Tiruppur. In recent years due to lack of employment opportunities, a sizeable number of educated youth have started migrating to cities like Chennai, Bangalore and Coimbatore.

Transport

Udumalpet is connected with Tiruppur, Pollachi, Dharapuram, Coimbatore, Palladam, Munnar, Palani, and Valparai by National highways, State highways and Major District roads.NH-209 connecting Dindigul with Coimbatore runs through the city. Udumalpet is 24 x 7 connected by government and private run bus services in Coimbatore - Dindigul highway.

Government and private buses run direct from Udumalpet to Tiruppur, Pollachi, Coimbatore, Mettupalayam, Valparai, Palladam, Dharapuram, Erode, Palani, Oddanchatram, Kodaikanal, Dindigul, Madurai, Tiruchirapalli, Chennai, Tirunelveli

The total length of roads, streets within corporate limits are about at 83.022  km. Consisting of 8.983 km of concrete road, 47,772 km of B.T roads and 26.627 km of other types of roads. The street pattern within the town is generally narrow. About 83.022 km of roads are within the municipal area and about 9.0 km belonging to the category of Major District Roads and National Highways.

The town is located in the Pollachi - Dindigul broad gauge section of the Indian Railways. It is connected with Coimbatore, Chennai, Madurai, Thiruvananthapuram, Palakkad, and Tiruchendur with daily trains. Currently two express train and two passenger trains are plying in these route.

Coimbatore International Airport (70 km) Tiruchirapalli Airport (200 km) Cochin International Airport (170 km) and Madurai Airport (175 km) serves the air transport needs of the city.

Udumalpet railway station;apt transit halt for Munnar.Station has 3 platforms-PF 1 is near entrance and booking/reservation counter staff are courteous,answering all queries.Approximate distance from Coimbatore is 70 kms. eg-Journey from UDUMALPET - COIMBATORE  is fast and reasonable @ Rs.45/- in a day Express running between Madurai-Coimbatore & back;all compartments are open tickets.

Festivals

Sri Mariamman Temple 
Sri Mariamman Temple is dedicated to Goddess Shakti. It is located in the city of Udumalpet, Tiruppur District, Tamil Nadu and is about 500 years old.  19 day main festival during Panguni Chithirai covering English months from March–May, Deepavali in October–November, Navarathri in September–October, Tirukarthikai in November–December, Fridays in Aadi month-July–August and full moon days are celebrated with special pujas. Nothing matter in cities. Farmers are delighted with the sound of rain. Around Udumalpet, 30+ villages have got rain during March end and the start of April. Chariot festival (தேர் திருவிழா) is famous.

Places to visit

The town is surrounded by Western Ghats and has a moderate weather throughout the year.

 Thirumoorthy hills - Thirumoorthy temple (Amanalingeswarar temple) and Thirumoorthy Dam is situated at the foothills of Western Ghats which attracts tourists throughout the year. Thirumoorthy Dam is a part of Parambikulam Aliyar Project. Waterfalls(Panchalimgam falls) in Thirumoorthy hills takes 15–20 minutes to reach by trekking from the Thirumoorthy Temple. One can also experience a state established swimming pool and facilities that have been made for the boat ride in Thirumoorthy dam. A caution note to be taken while bathing in Panchalinga falls or in the rivulet that follows and also in the marshy dam. The Thirumoorthy hills are well connected from town through road.
 Amaravathi Dam - Amaravathi dam located in the foothills of Western Ghats is endowed with many facilities for a casual picnic. The dam is built across the Amaravathi river. The crocodile park located near the dam is unique to this place. The Amaravathi Crocodile Farm, established in the year 1976 is one of the crocodile park in India. It is a part of Anamalai Tiger Reserve and maintained Tamil Nadu Forest department. The crocodile farm is located at a distance of 1 km from the dam. The small park near the dam can be a recreational zone accompanied by fish-based foods, readily available. Sainik school, an Indian Armed Forces establishment is located in Amaravathi Nagar. Boat riding is available in the dam. Amaravathi Nagar is well connected by road from the town.

Decent hotels for accommodation are available in the town. Trekking is possible and the same has to be consulted with the forest department office located in the Kerala.

Notable people
 

R. V. Swamy (born 1948), engineer and scholar

References

Cities and towns in Tiruppur district
Hill stations in Tamil Nadu